The Sweetest Thing is a 2002 American comedy film directed by Roger Kumble and written by Nancy Pimental, who based the characters on herself and friend Kate Walsh. It stars Cameron Diaz, Christina Applegate, and Selma Blair.

Plot
A group of men are interviewed regarding Christina Walters; they consider her a player and a user of men in the swinging singles market. She is a 28-year-old successful interior designer living in San Francisco near Chinatown.

Christina meets up with her friend Courtney Rockcliffe, a divorce lawyer. They console their friend and roommate Jane, who had recently broken up with her boyfriend, by taking her out to a dance club. Jane feels out of place, so Christina grabs a man named Peter to set Jane up with, but he berates Christina for her methods before disappearing for the night. While in the bathroom with Courtney, she calls him by name, leading her to suspect that he got under Christina's skin and she is actually in love with him, which she denies.

After running into Peter again, Christina buys him a drink and they spend time together. He explains that he will be attending a wedding on Saturday, and that he is at the club with his obnoxious, womanizing brother Roger to celebrate. He invites Christina and Courtney to an after-party at their hotel, but Christina goes home and later regrets not going.

The next day, while having lunch with Courtney, Christina cannot stop talking about Peter, while Jane pays an embarrassing visit to the dry cleaner. Courtney arranges for Christina and herself to travel to Somerset, where Peter's brother's wedding is to take place, and they meet Jane's boyfriend, whom she previously met at the club. After they leave in Courtney's Saab 9-5, Christina and Courtney go on a series of misadventures including an exploding toilet, a glory hole discovery, and a motorcyclist who is led to believe Courtney is receiving cunnilingus from Christina while driving.

Meanwhile, Jane encounters her boyfriend at her retail job and is nearly caught having sex with him in a changing room. When Christina and Courtney finally arrive in Somerset, they visit a store to replace their wet and ruined clothes, only to come out in extremely gaudy, indiscreet outfits. When they arrive at the wedding, Christina begins having second thoughts, but a series of coincidences, including a chance conversation with the bride, causes her to have a change of heart, and they attend. However, they discover that it is Peter, not Roger, who is getting married, and the pair nearly ruin the ceremony in their attempt to escape. Peter and his fiancée then decide that they do not want to marry each other and they call off the wedding.

Christina and Courtney return home and help Jane get out of a sexual situation with her boyfriend where the emergency crew was called in. Sometime later, Courtney is dating a doctor and is clearly very attracted to him, and Christina is back to a newly unfulfilled life of being single again. Later, Peter finds Christina's address in the log at the store they bought their clothes in and tracks her down. Christina, determined not to fear the commitment, kisses Peter and then walks away disappointed.

Peter is interviewed like the men at the beginning of the film, retelling his version of the events calling Christina a bitch and a player, but ultimately reveals that he and Christina are together, having gotten married and are living very happily with Jane, Courtney and Roger as well.

Cast

 Cameron Diaz as Christina Walters
 Christina Applegate as Courtney Rockcliffe
 Thomas Jane as Peter Donahue
 Selma Blair as Jane Burns
 Jason Bateman as Roger Donahue

 Parker Posey as Judy Webb

Home media
The film was released on DVD and VHS on August 20, 2002.

An unrated version was also released on DVD with some extra scenes added, including a musical performance by Diaz, Applegate and Blair, known as "The Penis Song".

Reception
On its opening weekend, it earned US$9,430,667 on 2,670 screens, ranking #3 behind Changing Lanes and Panic Room. It eventually grossed US$68,696,770 worldwide.

Critical response 
On Rotten Tomatoes the film has an approval rating of 26% based on 110 reviews, with an average rating of 4.30/10. The consensus calls the film "a collection of hit-or-miss gags tied together by a thin plot". On Metacritic, the film has an average score of 32 out of 100, based on 30 critics. Audiences surveyed by CinemaScore gave the film a grade C+ on scale of A to F.

It was among Ebert & Roeper's "Worst of 2002", in the category "Big Stars in Big Bombs".

Notes

References

External links

 
 
 
 

2002 films
2002 romantic comedy films
2000s buddy comedy films
2000s comedy road movies
2000s female buddy films
2000s sex comedy films
American buddy comedy films
American comedy road movies
American female buddy films
American romantic comedy films
American sex comedy films
Columbia Pictures films
Films directed by Roger Kumble
Films produced by Cathy Konrad
Films scored by Edward Shearmur
Films set in San Francisco
Films shot in San Francisco
2000s English-language films
2000s American films